The Hossack River is a river on the South Island of New Zealand.  It flows north from close to the Hossack Saddle, northwest of Hanmer Springs, before joining the Acheron River.

See also
List of rivers of New Zealand

References

Rivers of Canterbury, New Zealand
Rivers of New Zealand